Melfort (2016 population 5,992) is a city in Saskatchewan, Canada, located approximately  southeast of Prince Albert,  northeast of Saskatoon and  north of Regina.

Melfort became Saskatchewan's 12th city in 1980. Melfort was formerly called the "City of Northern Lights" due to the frequency with which the aurora borealis appears. However, in 2016, Melfort became "Play Melfort" due to its vast recreation programs and facilities.

The city is bordered by the Rural Municipality of Star City No. 428 and the Rural Municipality of Flett's Springs No. 429. It is also the administrative headquarters of the Peter Chapman First Nation band government.

History 
A few kilometres southeast of current location of Melfort settlers established themselves on the banks of Stoney Creek before relocation due to the surveying of the Canadian Northern Railway.
Melfort was named to honour Mrs. Reginald Beatty (née Mary Campbell, 1856–1916), wife of one of the early settlers (1884). She was born on the Melfort estate, south of Oban, in Argyllshire, Scotland.

Melfort's first post office was established August 1, 1892, in the provisional district of the North West Territories with Benjamin Rothwell as the first postmaster.

The community became a village on November 4, 1903, and incorporated as a town July 1, 1907. It finally became the twelfth city of Saskatchewan on September 2, 1980.

Three one-room school houses used the name "Melfort". Melfort School District No. 54, later called Tiger Lily No. 54 17, near Pleasantdale. (Pleasantdale post office was previously named Windgap and was located at Township 41, Range 18 west of the 2nd Meridian). Melfort School District No. 318 was established in 1904 at Clemens, Rural Route 1, Melfort. Melfort School District No. 1037 was the last one-room school house to use this name.

Geography 
Melfort is located in the Carrot River valley which is noted for its black loamy soil and productive agricultural lands.  The drainage region for Melfort is the Lower Saskatchewan - Nelson and the area is characterized by a prairie ecozone.
The Tiger Hills Uplands ecozone provides rich soil to grow a diversity of crops. Melfort Research Farm is located south of Melfort in the Boreal Shield ecozone and the Churchill drainage basin. The farm's main purpose is to research crops and crop systems for northern prairie black and grey soil zones.  The Melfort branch of the Canadian Legion has assembled a photographic display of the geographic memorials designated to honour the war dead.

Demographics 

Climate

Melfort experiences a humid continental climate (Köppen climate classification Dfb).

Economy 
The Agriculture Melfort Research Station is centred in Melfort along with many other agriculturally based industries.

The Melfort Research Farm near Melfort was established in 1935 by the Federal Minister of 
Agriculture.
It is one of the three field sites of the Saskatoon Research Centre (SRC). SRC is one of nineteen research branches of Agriculture and Agri-Food Canada.

Melfort is near a large diamond exploration site. The ongoing diamond exploration by a joint venture between Shore Gold Inc. Newmont Mining Corporation of Canada in the Fort à la Corne district was expected to begin mine construction in 2012.

Attractions 
Within the city of Melfort is the Melfort Golf & Country Club, which hosts an 18-hole grass greens golf course, and the Spruce Haven picnic area.  A show ring, grandstand, museum, and exhibition building are all located within the Melfort Exhibition Grounds.  The Melfort & District Museum next door showcases pioneering equipment, tools, farm machinery, archival documents as well as early settler's buildings  Neighbouring points of interest are Fort Carleton, Duck Lake, and Seager Wheeler's Maple Grove Farm.

Sports and recreation 
Melfort was home to the 2006 Saskatchewan Winter Games, the 1988 Saskatchewan Summer Games, the 1996 Royal Bank Cup Canadian Junior 'A' Hockey Championships, the 1995 Saskatchewan Men's Curling Pool Tankard finals and the 2002 Saskatchewan women's Scott Tournament of Hearts finals.  The Kerry Vickar Centre, a multi purpose sports and leisure facility, opened in the autumn of 2009  The previous multi-use facility at that location, the North East Leisure Centre, was taken down to make way for the new Kerry Vickar Centre.

Ice Hockey 
Hockey is a key part of Saskatchewan's lifestyle and Melfort is no different. The Melfort Mustangs play in the Saskatchewan Junior Hockey League. The Mustangs are well known in Canadian hockey circles in many ways—for instance Marc Habscheid, past coach of Canada's World Junior team, started his coaching career with the Mustangs in 1996.
Other notable Mustang alumni include Willie Mitchell of the Los Angeles Kings and Ruslan Fedetenko formerly of the Philadelphia Flyers.

Government 
Municipal affairs are handled by the city's mayor, Glenn George and council. City council currently consists of George and six councillors. The Rural Municipality of Flett's Springs No. 429 office is located on McDonald Avenue West in Melfort and provides municipal rural affairs to the small unincorporated areas of Claggett, Ethelton, Ethelton Airport, Flett Springs, Lipsett, McMichael, Melfort Airport, Minto Park, Pathlow, and Taylorside.

Melfort is in the federal electoral district of Prince Albert with their Member of Parliament being Randy Hoback.

Provincially, the area is within the constituency of Melfort with its MLA being Todd Goudy. He was preceded by Rod Gantefoer.

Transportation 
Melfort is located at the junction of two primary route highways, Highway 3 and Highway 6 where they meet with secondary Highway 41. Approximately  of Highway 6 contributes to the CanAm Highway between Corinne and Melfort. Approximately  of Highway 3 contribute to the CanAm Highway between Melfort and Prince Albert.

In 1925, Melfort was listed as a Canadian Pacific Railway (CPR) station on the CPR Melfort Subdivision. Melfort is currently a CNR interchange point and railway station on the Tisdale, St. Brieux and Brooksby Subdivisions.

Education 
The government's Canada-Saskatchewan Career and Employment Services office was to be combined with Melfort's Comprehensive High School and the Cumberland Regional College. The Melfort and Unit Comprehensive Collegiate provides education to grades 7 to 12 and is a part of the North East School Division No. 200.

Historically students in Melfort were educated at the Melfort School District Unit 54.

Media 
Print
The Melfort Journal, is the local newspaper, as well as providing news feeds to the community.

Radio
 CJVR-FM 105.1, airs a country music format, owned by Fabmar Communications
 CKJH AM 750, airs an oldies format, owned by Fabmar Communications

Notable people 

 Martine Gaillard is a sports television personality currently working for Rogers Sportsnet
 Lorne Henning, born in Melfort, is a Canadian NHL hockey executive and was previously a player and coach in the NHL.
 Arthur Hill was a Canadian actor best known for appearances in British and American theatre, movies and television.
 Grant Jennings raised in Melfort is a former National Hockey League (NHL) defenceman.
 Gordon Kirkby, born in Melfort, is a former mayor of Prince Albert (1988-1993) and Member of Parliament for Prince Albert--Churchill River (1993-1997).
 Lane Lambert, born in Melfort, is a Canadian retired professional ice hockey forward, uncle of Finnish-Canadian player Brad Lambert and is currently the head coach of the New York Islanders of the National Hockey League.
 Grant MacEwan, OC, AOE, was a farmer, professor at the University of Saskatchewan, Dean of Agriculture at the University of Manitoba, mayor of Calgary and both a Member of the Legislative Assembly (MLA) and Lieutenant Governor of Alberta, Canada.
 Pat MacLeod, born in Melfort, is a former professional ice hockey defenceman who played in the NHL for the Minnesota North Stars, San Jose Sharks and Dallas Stars in the 1990s.
 Jaden Schwartz, born in Melfort, is a current professional ice hockey forward who plays in the NHL for the St. Louis Blues.
 Nicole Watt, born in Melfort is a Canadian Women's figure skating Canadian silver medalist.
 Steven Woods, born in Melfort is a Canadian entrepreneur and co-founder of Quack.com, the first popular voice portal platform, in 1998.
 Logan Ferland, born in Melfort is an offensive lineman for the Saskatchewan Roughriders of the CFL, formerly of the Regina Thunder football club and the Melfort Comets football program.
 Tyson Strachan, born in Melfort, is a former National Hockey League (NHL) defenceman.

Further reading

References

External links 

Cities in Saskatchewan
Populated places established in 1892
Division No. 14, Saskatchewan
1892 establishments in Canada